Blass is a surname. Notable people with the surname include:

Andreas Blass, American mathematician
Bill Blass (1922–2002), American fashion designer
Dave Blass, American production designer
Friedrich Blass (1843–1907), German classical scholar
 Moses Blass (born 1937), Brazilian Olympic basketball medallist
Simcha Blass, (1897–1982), Israeli water engineer, inventor of drip irrigation systems
Steve Blass, baseball player and announcer
Tatiana Blass (born 1979), Brazilian artist
Valentin Blass, (born 1995) German basketball player
Valérie Blass (born 1967), Canadian artist 
William Joel Blass, Mississippi attorney, educator, and politician 
Wolf Blass, East German-born Australian winemaker

See also
DJ Blass, Puerto-Rican record producer
Blas